The 1969 All-East football team consists of American football players chosen by various selectors as the best players at each position among the Eastern colleges and universities during the 1969 NCAA University Division football season.

The undefeated 1969 Penn State Nittany Lions football team was ranked No. 2 in the final AP and UPI polls and placed eight players on the All-East first team.

Offense

Quarterback
 Rich Policastro, Rutgers (AP-1)

Running backs
 Ed Marinaro, Cornell (AP-1)
 Lynne Moore, Army (AP-1)
 Charley Pittman, Penn State (AP-1)
 Franco Harris, Penn State (AP-2)

Ends
 Jim Benedict, Rutgers (AP-1)
 Tony Gabriel, Syracuse (AP-1)

Tackles
 Bob Bouley, Boston College (AP-1)
 John Cherundolo, Syracuse (AP-1)

Guards
 Dave Mills, Dartmouth (AP-1)
 Charlie Zapiec, Penn State (AP-1)

Center
 Dave Magyar, Pittsburgh (AP-1)

Defense

Ends
 Jim Gallagher, Yale (AP-1)
 Tim Vigneau, Buffalo (AP-1)

Tackles
 Mike Reid, Penn State (AP-1)
 Steve Smear, Penn State (AP-1)

Middle guard
 Jim Kates, Penn State (AP-1)

Linebackers
 Dennis Onkotz, Penn State (AP-1)
 Jack Ham, Penn State (AP-1)
 Ralph Cindrich, Pittsburgh (AP-1)

Backs  
 Joe Adams, Dartmouth (AP-1)
 Bruce Taylor, Boston University (AP-1) 
 Neal Smith, Penn State (AP-1 [safety])

Key
 AP = Associated Press
 UPI = United Press International

See also
 1969 College Football All-America Team

References

All-Eastern
All-Eastern college football teams